Santa Lucía is a municipality and town in the Colombian department of Atlántico. The town is located on the north bank of the Dique Canal.

References

External links
 Gobernacion del Atlantico - Santa Lucía
 Santa Lucía official website

Municipalities of Atlántico Department